Adasburg is an unincorporated community in Wilkes County, in the U.S. state of Georgia.

History
A post office called Adasburg was established in 1887, and remained in operation until 1905. The community had an inland location away from the railroad.

References

Unincorporated communities in Wilkes County, Georgia
Unincorporated communities in Georgia (U.S. state)